U.S. Route 45 (US 45) enters Kentucky at Fulton in Fulton County and travels northeast through Hickman County, Graves County, and McCracken County. After passing through Mayfield in Graves County it heads directly north into Paducah as a four-lane highway. In Paducah, US 45 serves as a major artery, intersecting with Interstate 24 at Exit 7, and intersecting US 60 and 62. U.S. 45 leaves Kentucky from Paducah's northern border across the two-lane, metal-grate Brookport Bridge to Brookport, Illinois across the Ohio River.

Route description

US 45 enters Kentucky at Fulton in Fulton County where it travels around the west side and then north side of town before entering Hickman County. It travels just to the south and east of the Purchase Parkway as it passes briefly through Hickman County and into Graves County. In Graves County US 45 travels northeast and passes through the communities of Water Valley and Wingo. Just north of town, US 45 intersects US 45 Bypass and Purchase Parkway and becomes a four-lane divided highway as it turns toward the north. US 45 continues northward through rural sections of Graves County and into McCracken County. The previous routing between these two points is now designated Kentucky Route 1241. In McCracken County, US 45 passes through Lone Oak and then passes under I-24 as it enters Paducah. In Paducah, US 45 forms intersections with US 60, US 62, US 60 Business, I-24 Business, and US 45 Business as it passes through the western part of town. US 45 crosses the Ohio River via the Brookport Bridge into Illinois  from the Tennessee state line.

History

US 45 was signed in Kentucky by 1928, although it was not yet paved. The entire route in Kentucky was paved by 1939.

Major intersections

Special routes

Mayfield bypass

Since the former Purchase Parkway has been re-designated I-69, US 45 Bypass signs have been removed from the I-69 concurrency, and the north interchange with US 45.

Paducah business route

US 45 Business in Paducah begins at an intersection with US 45 in downtown Paducah and travels northeast through town. As it nears the Ohio River, it turns to the northwest and ends at a junction with US 45 south of the Brookport Bridge over the Ohio River  from its origin.

References

 Kentucky
45
Transportation in Fulton County, Kentucky
Transportation in Hickman County, Kentucky
Transportation in Graves County, Kentucky
Transportation in McCracken County, Kentucky